Theodore Raphan is an American neuroscientist. He is Broeklundian Distinguished Professor of Computer and Information Science at Brooklyn College, City University of New York. and also a published author.

References

External links

American computer scientists
Brooklyn College faculty
Year of birth missing (living people)
Living people